The Park Plaza Apartment Complex is a group of two twin-structured residential buildings in Hurstville, New South Wales. Park Plaza One is the St. George District's tallest structure of any kind, standing at a roof height of 67.2 metres, it is 2 metres taller than the 2nd tallest in St. George, the "Proximity A Building" in Rockdale, New South Wales. Due to its height, it can be clearly seen by several observation decks in Sydney, especially the Sydney Tower observation platform.

Park Plaza One sits on 25-35A Park Rd on the intersection of Cross Street and Park Road and Park Plaza Two resides on the intersection of Park Road and Woodville Street (25–35B Park Rd.) Access to the buildings is for tenants only and the entrances to the lobbies are under surveillance 24 hours a day. Two entrances currently exist to Park Plaza One. The main entrance on Park Road with automatic doors and a back door on Cross Street with a keyhole. Park Plaza two, however, only has one entrance on Woodville Street.

See also
 Hurstville, New South Wales
 St. George, New South Wales

References

External links
  Park Plaza Apartments at emporis.com
  "Park Plaza: More Than Meets the Eye" YouTube Video
  "The Hurstville/Rockdale Region (Sydney): Earth Hour 2010" YouTube Video featuring Park Plaza

Skyscrapers in Sydney
Residential buildings completed in 1996
Apartment buildings in Sydney